Telecommunications in Iceland is a diversified market.

Submarine connectivity 
Current internet and telephone services rely on submarine communications cables for external traffic, with a total capacity of 60.2Tbit/s

Current 

 FARICE-1, 2 fiber pairs, with lit 11 Tbit/s to the United Kingdom and the Faroe Islands laid in 2003
 DANICE, 4 fiber pairs, with lit 36.4 Tbit/s to Denmark, laid in 2009.
 Greenland Connect, 2 fiber pairs, with lit 12.8 Tbit/s to Newfoundland and Labrador, Canada and Greenland, laid in 2009.

Former 

 CANTAT-3, 3 fiber pairs, with capacity of 7.5 Gbit/s to Denmark, Germany, Faroe Islands and Canada (1994-2009)
 SCOTICE, coaxial cable, to Faroe Islands onto Scotland, 32 telephone circuits (1961-1987)
 ICECAN, coaxial cable, to Greenland onto Canada, 24 telephone circuits (1961-1987)
 Great Northern Telegraph Co., Seyðisfjörður to Faroe Islands onto Shetland Islands to UK (1906-1962)

Under Construction 

 IRIS, 6 fiber pairs, with 108 Tbit/s initial capacity to Galway, Ireland, due to be laid summer 2022.

Services

Internet

Data centres 
 THOR Data Center ehf
 DataCell ehf
 Verne Global
 Basis ehf

Internet service providers 
The largest Internet service providers in Iceland:

 Síminn (Síminn hf)
 Vodafone Iceland (Sýn hf)
 Nova (Nova hf)
 Hringiðan (Hringiðan ehf / Vortex Inc)
 Hringdu (Hringdu ehf)

Internet hosting service 
Iceland has numerous internet hosting services:

 (1984 ehf)
 Advania (Advania ehf)
 (Davíð og Golíat ehf)
 FlokiNET (FlokiNET ehf)
 Síminn (Síminn hf)
 (Netmiðlar ehf)
 (Netvistun ehf)
 (Nethönnun ehf)
 TechSupport á Íslandi (TechSupport á Íslandi ehf)
 (Tölvuþjónustan Geymir sf)
 Vodafone Iceland (Sýn hf)
 Vortex (Hringiðan ehf)

Internet exchange point 
Iceland has an internet exchange point called the Reykjavik Internet Exchange (RIX).

Mail

Print

Daily newspapers 

 Morgunblaðið

Free daily newspapers 

 Fréttablaðið

Weekly and bi-weekly Newspapers 

 DV
 Viðskiptablaðið
 Bændablaðið
 Stundin

English Language Newspapers 

 The Reykjavík Grapevine

Radio

Public broadcasters: 
RÚV

 Rás 1
 Rás 2

Commercial broadcasters 

 Bylgjan
 FM 957

Telephone

Landline 
As of 2018 there are 75,716 landlines in use in Iceland of which 73,361 are PSTN. ISDN 2B and 30B subscriptions make up 1,971 and 384 respectively. The number of landlines in Iceland has been slowly decreasing since their peak in 2001 at 196,528. Meanwhile, the number of VoIP subscriptions have been rising, from 58,311 in 2016 to 76,122 in 2018. 2018 was the first year that VoIP subscriptions surpassed PSTN subscriptions. Síminn, the operator of the POTS network has indicated that a complete shut down of the POTS network is ongoing and is due to be completed in 2022. Existing landline customers will be transitioned over to VoIP services.

Source: Statistics Iceland (statice.is)

Mobile 

As of 2010 there are 341,077 active GSM (2G) and UMTS (3G) subscriptions in use in Iceland. In 2010, all NMT (1G) networks were shut down. Nova was first to offer 4G followed by Síminn. 5G services were launched in 2020 by Nova, followed by Síminn. 2G services are due to be shut down in 2024 and 3G in 2025.

Source: Statistics Iceland (statice.is)

Telephone calling 

Source: Statistics Iceland (statice.is)

Text messaging

Telephone numbers 

There are no area codes in Iceland, and all telephone numbers have seven digits. The international dialling code is +354. Due to the Icelandic naming system, people are listed by their first name in the telephone directory, and not by their last name (which is usually patronym, or, rarely, a matronym).

Television 

Television in Iceland began in September 1966.

Source: Statistics Iceland (statice.is)

References

External links 
 Reykjavik Internet Exchange 
 Reykjavik Internet Exchange